Events in the year 1848 in Brazil.

Incumbents
Monarch – Pedro II.
Prime Minister – 2nd Viscount of Caravelas (until 8 March), Viscount of Macaé (from 8 March to 31 March), Francisco de Paula Sousa e Melo (from 31 March to 29 September), Viscount of Olinda (starting 29 September).

Events
May 7 - establishment of the Roman Catholic Archdiocese of Porto Alegre as the Diocese of São Pedro do Rio Grande.
November 6 - beginning of Praieira revolt.

Births
July 7 - Francisco de Paula Rodrigues Alves, President of Brazil 1902-1906.

Deaths

References

 
1840s in Brazil
Years of the 19th century in Brazil
Brazil
Brazil